Pedro Ángel Richter Fernández-Prada (4 January 1921 – 14 July 2017) was a Peruvian politician who was the prime minister of Peru from January 31, 1979 until July 28, 1980. On December 28, 2007, the Italian government issued an arrest warrant for Prada for the disappearance of 25 Italian citizens in the 1970s. In February 2015 a trial started in Italy related to Operation Condor, there were indictments against 32 people, including Richter Prada. He was charged with aggravated murder. Richter Prada also served as Minister of Defense and Commander-in-Chief of the Army. Richter Prada died on 14 July 2017 at the age of 96.

References 

1921 births
2017 deaths
Vice presidents of Peru
Prime Ministers of Peru
Government ministers of Peru
Peruvian politicians convicted of crimes
People from Ayacucho